Osvaldo Lara Cañizares (born July 13, 1955 in Havana) is a retired male track and field sprinter from Cuba, who represented his native country at the 1980 Summer Olympics in Moscow, Soviet Union. He reached both 100/200 finals where he finished 5th in the 100. And 8th in the 200.

In 1984 he missed the Los Angeles Olympics due to the boycott, but he competed at the Friendship Games in Moscow, where he won the 100 metres.

Achievements

External links
 Year Ranking
 
 trackfield.brinkster

Cuban male sprinters
Athletes (track and field) at the 1980 Summer Olympics
Athletes (track and field) at the 1979 Pan American Games
Athletes (track and field) at the 1983 Pan American Games
Olympic athletes of Cuba
Pan American Games silver medalists for Cuba
Pan American Games medalists in athletics (track and field)
1955 births
Living people
Athletes from Havana
Universiade medalists in athletics (track and field)
Central American and Caribbean Games gold medalists for Cuba
Competitors at the 1978 Central American and Caribbean Games
Competitors at the 1982 Central American and Caribbean Games
Universiade bronze medalists for Cuba
Central American and Caribbean Games medalists in athletics
Medalists at the 1977 Summer Universiade
Medalists at the 1979 Pan American Games
Medalists at the 1983 Pan American Games
Friendship Games medalists in athletics
20th-century Cuban people